Hiromi Amada (born May 10, 1973) is a retired Japanese heavyweight kickboxer and boxer from Gunma, Japan. A staple in the K-1 heavyweight division from 1999 to 2007, the company considered him one of its most talented Japanese fighters, second only to Musashi. He is also the first-ever HEAT Heavyweight Kickboxing Champion and holds notable victories over Freddy Kemayo, Makoto Uehara, and Rene Rooze.

Early life
Amada began practicing boxing as a teenager while attending Maebashi Ikuei High School, and won the national junior championship prior to graduation. He then attended Chuo University and served as captain of the school's boxing club, all the while competing at the amateur level. In 1996, he won the All Japan Amateur Boxing Championships.

Career

K-1
The K-1 kickboxing organization scouted Amada before he even graduated from university. He made his professional debut on March 22, 1999, at K-1 The Challenge '99, earning a unanimous decision victory over the larger John Wyatt. Eschewing kicks and utilizing a boxing-based style, Amada achieved a 5-0 winning streak en route to reaching the finals of his first tournament – the K-1 Spirits '99. He fought the world champion Musashi, who delivered him his first defeat via unanimous decision.

Amada spent the following five years falling short of substantial success. He entered the K-1 Spirits 2000, K-1 World Grand Prix 2000 in Fukuoka, and K-1 Survival 2003 Japan Grand Prix Final tournaments, only to be defeated in latter rounds. Nevertheless, he earned significant victories along the way. He knocked out the aggressive Dutch giant Rene Rooze at K-1 Rising 2002 and MMA champion Tom Erikson at K-1 Beast 2003. Then, he met Eric “Butterbean” Esch at K-1 Beast 2004 in Niigata and scored an upset over the world champion boxer. Esch continually taunted and baited his opponent, at one point dropping his gloves and absorbing several unguarded blows to the head. Despite this show of toughness, Amada – who had by then broadened his repertoire to include low kicks – peppered the American for three rounds while staying out of range of Esch's punches, leading to a unanimous decision victory.

On June 26, 2004, Amada finally acquired a tournament win by becoming the K-1 Beast 2004 in Shizuoka champion. The achievement brought him to the K-1 World Grand Prix 2004 Final Elimination, where he lost his chance of competing in the K-1 World Grand Prix 2004 Final to Ray Sefo via unanimous decision. Amada would in fact appear at the event, but in a reserve fight he lost to Jérôme Le Banner.

Departure from K-1 and later career
Amada remained with K-1 for the better part of three years following 2004, earning a victory over future world champion Freddy Kemayo in the process. However, the company suspended him following a 2007 incident wherein Amada allegedly assaulted a truck driver following a traffic incident in Tokyo. His last match for the organization prior to departure was a losing effort to Paul Slowinski at K-1 World Grand Prix 2007 in Amsterdam.

For the remainder of his career, Amada competed for a variety of organizations but found the most success in HEAT, a fledgling promotion which held all its matches in an octagonal cage. He entered a tournament to crown the company's first heavyweight kickboxing champion, and eventually emerged victorious with a KO win over Makoto Uehara at HEAT 10 on July 18, 2009. Amada reigned as champion for over 20 months, successfully defending his title twice before losing it at HEAT 22 to Fabiano Aoki. Amada consequently departed from HEAT and only fought for the company once more, unsuccessfully challenging Prince Ali for his old championship at HEAT 36.

Continuing in journeyman fashion, Amada competed for only one more title: the RISE Heavyweight Championship on April 29, 2014. Despite being 40 years old at the time – over a decade older than his opponent, Kengo Shimizu – Amada surprised the audience by being the more aggressive fighter, pushing in close with his signature boxing offense. By the third round, Shimizu's visible exhaustion contrasted with Amada's apparent vigor. Nevertheless, the younger champion landed a surprise kick to Amada's head which sent the challenger to the canvas and cost him the match.

Amada fought his last match to date on September 18, 2016, at the New Japan Kickboxing Association's Titans Neo 20 event, achieving a unanimous decision victory over Mauro Herrera.

Personal life
From 2005 to 2007, in addition to his kickboxing career, Amada worked for a real estate company. His contract was canceled when the firm declared bankruptcy.

He has a wife who shares his first name; both are called Hiromi Amada. He also has a daughter and twin sons.

While a senior at Chuo University, he shared a dorm with basketball player Kenichi Sako.

In 2019, Amada was arrested in Aomori City for violating city ordinances.

Titles
Kickboxing
2009 HEAT Heavyweight Kickboxing Champion
K-1 Beast 2004 in Shizuoka Champion
Amateur boxing
 1996 All Japan Amateur Boxing Champion
 1996 National Athletic Meet at Fukushima Amateur Boxing Champion

Kickboxing record

Boxing record

|-
|-  bgcolor="#CCFFCC"
| 2010-08-25 || Win ||align=left| Sudo ShinTakashi || Boxfight - First Impact || Tokyo, Japan || KO || 2 || 1:36 || 1-0
|-
|-
| colspan=9 | Legend:

Mixed martial arts record

|-
|-  bgcolor="#CCFFCC"
| 2013-02-23 || Win ||align=left| Shogun Okamoto || IGF 24 || Tokyo, Japan || KO || 3 || 0:17 || 2-0
|-
|-  bgcolor="#CCFFCC"
| 2012-10-16 || Win ||align=left| Yusuke Kawaguchi || IGF 23 || Tokyo, Japan || KO || 2 || 1:42 || 1-0
|-
|-
|-
| colspan=9 | Legend:

See also
List of K-1 Events
List of male kickboxers

References

External links
Official K-1 website
Hiromi Amada K-1 profile

1973 births
Living people
Japanese male kickboxers
Heavyweight kickboxers
People from Gunma Prefecture
Boxers at the 1994 Asian Games
Olympic boxers of Japan
Japanese male boxers
Asian Games competitors for Japan
Light-middleweight boxers